Chronic active EBV infection  or in its expanded form, chronic active Epstein–Barr virus infection is a very rare and often fatal complication of Epstein–Barr virus (EBV) infection that most often occurs in children or adolescents of Asian or South American lineage, although cases in Hispanics, Europeans and Africans have been reported. It is classified as one of the Epstein-Barr virus-associated lymphoproliferative diseases (i.e. EBV+ LPD).

Presentation

The most common symptoms of CAEBV include:

 Fever
 Hepatitis
 Pancytopenia
 Spleen enlargement
 Hypersensitivity to mosquito bites

Complications include:

 Interstitial pneumonia
 Lymphoma, including B-cell, T-cell and NK-cell lymphomas
 Haemophagocytic syndrome
 Coronary artery aneurysms
 Liver failure
 Nasopharyngeal carcinoma
 Gastric adenocarcinoma
 CNS
 Intestinal perforation
 Myocarditis
 Peripheral neuropathy

Pathophysiology
It arises from the cells that constitute the immune system, most often the T-cells and NK cells in Asians/South Americans and the B-cells in the other racial groups. Various cytokine anomalies have been reported in people with CAEBV, examples include:

 IL-1β ↑ (elevated)
 IL-4 ↑
 IL-6 ↑
 IL-10 ↑
 IL-12 ↑
 IL-13 ↑
 IL-15 ↑
 TNF ↑
 IFN-γ ↑

There is also evidence supporting a role for TGF-β in the disease. Those that develop the haemophagocytic syndrome often exhibit an abnormally high amount of IL-1β and IFN-γ.

Diagnosis

Treatment
The only known cure for CAEBV is allogenic haematopoietic stem cell transplant (HSCT), with all other treatment options (rituximab, cytotoxic chemotherapy and immunosuppressive therapy) being nothing more than stopgaps.

Prognosis
Without HSCT the condition is inevitably fatal and even HSCT is no guarantee, with a significant portion of patients dying from the disease progression. Factors indicative of a poor prognosis include: thrombocytopenia, late onset of the disease (age ≥ 8 years) and T cell involvement.

References

Epstein–Barr virus–associated diseases